Patricia "Paddy" Croft (July 1, 1923 – July 27, 2015) was an English born Irish-American actress of stage and screen.

Biograhy and career
Croft was born in Worthing, West Sussex, England in 1923.

A character actress who usually played Irish roles on stage, in film and on television, she was affiliated with the Irish Repertory Theatre in New York City, most recently in 2005 as Madge in a revival of Brian Friel's Philadelphia, Here I Come. She also appeared in Hugh Leonard's Da, and often served as standby or understudy on Broadway in productions of Major Barbara, Night Must Fall, The Plough and the Stars, and The Killing of Sister George, sometimes assuming the roles upon the departure of the star for whom she was covering, the last such occasion being in 1999 in the revival of Night Must Fall, starring Matthew Broderick, when Croft succeeded the departing Judy Parfitt. Her last role on Broadway was in The Dead in 2000.

In 1973, she appeared in Crown Matrimonial receiving good notices for her performance as Mary, Princess Royal supporting Eileen Herlie's Queen Mary.

Croft also appeared on television, including on the long-running NBC series Law & Order and Law and Order: Special Victims Unit.

Filmography

Film

Television

References

External links
 
 
 
  (archive)

1923 births
2015 deaths
American people of Irish descent
American stage actresses
American television actresses
Place of death missing
People from Manhattan
21st-century American women